The 2006–07 Austrian Hockey League season was the 77th season of the Austrian Hockey League, the top level of ice hockey in Austria. Eight teams participated in the league, and EC Red Bull Salzburg won the championship.

Regular season

Playoffs

External links
Austrian Ice Hockey Association

Aus
1
Austrian Hockey League seasons
Aus